Temirbolot Tapaev (born 1 August 1999 in Bishkek) is a Kyrgyz professional footballer who plays as a winger for Dordoi Bishkek and the Kyrgyzstan national team.

Club career
For the 2020 season, Tapev was one of the top fifteen scorers in the Kyrgyz Premier League with three goals for Alga Bishkek. To kick off the 2021 Kyrgyz Premier League season, he scored a sensational long range shot which went on to be Alga's game-winner against Ilbirs Bishkek.

On 11 January 2023, Dordoi Bishkek announced the return of Tapaev to the club on a one-year contract.

International career
Tapaev began his international career in 2018 AFC U-19 Championship qualification. He scored a goal in Kyrgyzstan’s third match which ended in a 2–1 victory over Bahrain. He appeared for the Kyrgyzstan under-23 team in one match during the 2018 Asian Games and in 2020 AFC U-23 Championship qualification. In March 2021 he was part of the under-23 squad again for matches against the senior teams of Bangladesh and Nepal in the 2021 Three Nations Cup in Kathmandu.

In September 2018 Tapaev was named to the senior roster for a friendly against Syria. However he did not go on to feature in the match. He made his senior international debut on 2 September 2021 in a 2021 Three Nations Cup friendly against Palestine as a second-half substitute.

International career statistics

References

External links

1999 births
Living people
Kyrgyzstani footballers
Kyrgyzstan international footballers
Association football midfielders
FC Dordoi Bishkek players
FC Alga Bishkek players